Highfield is the second oldest high-density suburb or township in Harare, Zimbabwe built to house Rhodesians of African origin, the first being Mbare. Highfield was founded on what used to be Highfields Farm. It is of historical, cultural and political significance to Zimbabwe and is known as Fiyo in local slang. It is one of the birthplaces of the Zimbabwe African National Union and is home to several prominent people in the country such as Gregy Vambe and Oliver Mtukudzi, and formerly Robert Mugabe.

Brief history 
Highfield was built by the Southern Rhodesian government in the 1930s as a segregated township to house predominantly black labourers and their families during the colonial era, the first being Mbare (National) which was known by locals as "Haarare" or "Haarari" which gave its name to the modern capital of Zimbabwe, Harare. Haarare which translates to "ever vigilant" or directly as "one who never sleeps" was also a name given to the Zezuru Chief of this area, Chief Harawa.

Highfield was established to accommodate workers employed in the nearby industrial zones of Southerton and Workington in similar fashion to how Mbare had been set up to provide for those employed in Workington, Graniteside and as domestic labour to European households in the city's northern and western suburbs.

Highfield has remained a poor suburb despite the regeneration in other areas after 1980. Most of its successful residents choose to move out of the area (in a similar pattern to other high-density areas) rather than invest and set up in the area. It also remains a primary destination (like most high-density areas in Zimbabwe) for rural to urban migrants, who find it easier to pay for accommodation there and commute to work. They are also attracted by the easier opportunities to start up home businesses at Machipisa and Gazaland Home Industry areas. It thus remains heavily populated, with high unemployment and is socially deprived. Petty crime is high as well as more serious crimes like burglaries, assaults and grievous bodily harm.

Location 
It is located in South West Harare and is bordered by Glen Norah (formerly Baxter Farm) to the South West, Waterfalls to the South East, Willowvale and Southerton spanning North East to North West. The centre of Highfield is marked by the North Eastern corner of Chengu Primary School. Highfield was founded on what used to be Highfields Farm. The farmhouses have become the Rutsanana Clinic and municipal buildings in what is now Glen Norah suburb, a stone's throw from the former Municipal Compound, locally known as the "Short Lines".

Areas of Highfield 
Highfield is divided into several zones, the primary zones being Old Highfield and New Highfield. New Highfield was established in 1956 and comprises Lusaka, named after the Zambian capital, a testimony to a significant part of its population who are of Zambian and Malawian origin; Egypt, Jerusalem and Canaan named after biblical places; Engineering; Cherima (Dark Zone) used to be off the electricity grid; Zororo (place of rest); and Western Triangle which literary forms a triangle to the west where Highfield border with Glen Norah and Glen View. The newest area of Highfield is Paradise (1996) which is located at the southern end and borders Lusaka; it connects Highfield to nearby Glen Norah suburb to the South and part of it is in Glen Norah.

Old Highfield was established in the 1930s, and it comprises 3 distinct areas, namely The 2 Pounds, 5 Pounds, 12 Pounds and The Stands. The most affluent parts of Highfield are the two areas of Old Highfield; The Stands and the 5 Pounds. The Stands are so named because when first sold, the area was a greenfield and residents had to build houses of their choices; this is in comparison to the other areas of Highfield where the government had built low-cost basic housing for the natives and sold it at reflective prices. Historically, the yards here are very large and the houses, flamboyant and indulgent to reflect the affluent status of the black Rhodesians who settled here. Black Rhodesians who, even if they afforded, could not buy properties outside African designated areas, naturally settled there. Some of the famous Zimbabweans to own properties here include musician Innocent Utsiwegota's family, the Mwaera family, the Tawengwa family and Robert Mugabe. The 5 Pounds area is so named because the houses here were priced at 5 Rhodesian pounds when first sold, compared to the average of 2 pounds in other areas as reflected in the 2 Pounds name. The 2 Pounds area is relatively deprived in comparison to the other two.

Political history 
Highfield was the birthplace of the Zimbabwe African National Union and its immediate successor, ZANU PF. In the 1960s the suburb was home to some of most influential black nationalists in Southern Rhodesia. These included Reverend Ndabaningi Sithole, the first president of ZANU, Joshua Nkomo president of ZAPU, George Nyandoro, Enock Dumbunjena, Herbert Chitepo, Zimbabwean president Robert Mugabe, Maurice Nyagumbo, Leopold Takawira, Emmerson Dambudzo Mnangagwa, Michael Mawema, and others. Takawira, the first vice-president of ZANU, was formerly the headmaster of Chipembere Primary School in Highfield.

Robert Mugabe's house can still be seen in Old Highfield, where it stands, riddled with bullet holes from an incident during the Rhodesian Bush War. Mugabe remained a constituent member of Old Highfield and always cast his vote at Mhofu Primary School, a walking distance from his previous residence.

Highfield suburb was considered an exceptional subversion risk by the Rhodesian authorities and surrounded by a security fence.Residents were compelled to carry registration papers or face detention. The raid on the fuel storage tanks in Workington by guerrillas in 1979 was orchestrated in, and launched from Highfield.

Robert Mugabe and his ZANU party held his 'star rally' campaign during Rhodesia's 1980 elections  at the Zimbabwe Grounds in Highfield. This is where he made his famous speech of how ZANU was organised into districts and cells, and that it was inevitable that he would win by a significant majority in the impending elections. The Zimbabwe Grounds comprise 5 football pitches, a cricket ground, tennis and basketball courts. The grounds are surrounded by Old Highfield section on the greater part and share borders with Takashinga cricket ground (home ground to Andy Flower and Tatenda Taibu), Zimbabwe Hall, Highfield Library, a Nursery School, Anglican Church and Chipembere Primary School Annexe. The grounds are within a stone's throw from Gwanzura football stadium.

Zimbabwean security forces later clashed with opposition party members and church members at the Zimbabwe Grounds during a "peaceful meeting" on 11 March 2007 to "bring back democracy to Zimbabwe". Highfield and the Zimbabwe Grounds seem to continue to be launchpads for political change in Zimbabwe. These disturbances resulted in the fatal shooting of Gift Tandare, a member of the Movement for Democratic Change. The family were apparently denied permission to bury him in Harare because the government feared reprisals from the MDC supporters. Gift Tandare was buried in his rural home.

Again in November 2007 Mugabe held a rally at the Zimbabwe Grounds which he termed the "Million Man March".

Highfield boasts some of the best social amenities in country with 11 government-owned primary schools and 6 High schools. It has other private schools and colleges offering mostly secondary school education and post school courses, the most common being computers, secretarial, cut and designing.

Education 
The most prominent high school in Highfield is Highfield High School 1. This was established in 1963 and then, was a preserve of the academic black elite. The majority of its students are from the 11 local primary schools, but it also serves surrounding suburbs of Glen Norah and Glen View. It offers secondary education from form 1 to form 6 (A Level). Academically, it remains an average school with pass rates at O level being in line with the national average. It performs better at A Levels were pass rate is well over 90%. However, few of its graduates achieve enough points to be admitted to the top universities in the country, University of Zimbabwe (UZ) in Harare, and National University of Science and Technology (NUST), in Bulawayo.

The other high schools are Mukai (Lusaka), Kwayedza (Western Triangle), Highfield 2 (Egypt), AEC (Gazaland) and Highfield Community/ Mhuriimwe (Old Highfield). Highfield Community/Mhuriimwe was built before Zimabawe's independence to cater for those students who failed to get a place at Highfield 1. This was an effort by nationalist leaders that include Robert Mugabe to bring education to what was one of the most deprived 'black areas' in Harare at the time. Mugabe, a teacher by profession became a teacher at this school. This school remains lowly regarded in Highfield and it performs well below the national average. As such, a good percentage of students at this school are not from Highfield.

Amenities 
The major shopping centre is Machipisa Shopping Centre, this was named after a prominent black businessman (Paul Machipisa); a store bearing his name can still be found at Mbare Musika bus terminus. All the major business people at this centre financially supported the fight for independence. These include Machipisa, Mwaera, Makomva, George Tawengwa – owner of Mushandirapamwe Hotel and others. Mushandirapamwe Hotel was at independence the transitional residence of returning Zanu troops and Paul Tangi Mhova Mkondo's – owner of Sharaude Taxi Services, whose regional headquarters is there (Sharaude Taxi Services was instrumental for providing transport and logistics to nationalists and freedom fighters to and from the city). Machipisa grew to be a prominent shopping centre because movement of black people was restricted before 1980, and it was therefore necessary to have a self-sufficient shopping local area. Machipisa Shopping Centre is a well established trading centre that boasts banks (Barclays, CABS, CBZ, POSB, African Century Bank and many new local banks), Night clubs (Saratoga, Jimalo - owned by Philip Chiyangwa's brother Jimmy), Mushandirapamwe Hotel (formerly a 3-star hotel that hosted Cameroon national team during their visit to Zimbabwe in 1990s), City Council Bar with the Gold and Silver rooms where admission demands formal dressing. Machipisa boasts most major grocery shops in Zimbabwe, these include OK, TM, Spar and Lucky 7.

The most modern shopping centre established in Highfield is the High Glen Shopping Centre on the north-western end of Highfield at border junction with Glen Norah and Glen View suburbs. However, despite its glamour and glitz, High Glen has failed to attract many shoppers because of its long distance from most residential areas. It however attracts the more affluent shoppers from the Marimba Park area of the nearby Mufakose suburb who can afford to drive to the centre.

Highfield is host to Gwanzura stadium which hosts local premiership soccer matches. Gwanzura has been a home ground to CAPS United, Blue Line Ace and  Black Aces. Andy Flower and Tatenda Taibu were members of Highfield Takashinga Cricket Club. Stuart Matsikenyeri and Hamilton Masakadza still play for this team.

Highfield Library is one of the best equipped libraries in the country with well-developed children's sections, primary and secondary sections and college sections. This was built by the Chinese and opened by President Robert Mugabe in 1993 to replace the old library at Zimbabwe Hall.

The Zimbabwe Hall remains a centre for public and private functions, with the Miss Highfield, Miss Highfield Schools, and Miss Zim Hall held regularly. It is a major centre for Jamaican-inspired dancehall music and culture. Dancehall and ragga music clashes are held here often, with Silverstone, Stereo One, Small Axe, Sweet Ebony and African Exodus Batanai being regulars. Zimbabwe Hall also hosts a gym, study centre, and a printing centre. The Highfield Tennis Club, Netball Club and volleyball teams are based at this centre.

Leisure facilities also include a swimming bath open to the public, tennis and basketball courts at the Zimbabwe grounds and Zimbabwe hall amongst other things.

Churches 
Highfield is also famous for its numerous churches of all denominations; these include Seventh Day Adventist (SDA), Roman Catholic churches (St Mark's, St Paul's, St Mary's branches in Engineering, Old Highfield and others), Anglican (Old Highfield and others), Reformed Church in Zimbabwe (Canaan), Dutch Reformed Church (Canaan), Methodist in Zimbabwe (John Wesley in Lusaka and others), United Methodist Church (in Old Highfield and others), Pentecostal Church (Egypt and others), Zaoga, FOG, Lutheran (Old Highfield and others), Salvation Army (old Highfield and others), Apostolic Faith Church (Sengwayo)-Vhangeri (Lusaka and Zororo), Baptist (Canaan and others), Maranatha, Presbyterian (Old Highfield), Johanne Masowe, Mai Chaza, The African Apostolic Church led by E P Mwazha, Seventh Day Adventist (Western triangle and others), Jehovah's Witness, Mapositori/Apostles (over 100 numerous sects), AFM and others. For the full list of churches one can visit the Zimbabwe Council of Churches.

Notable people from Highfield

Politics and business
 Joshua Nkomo – founding father, former vice-president of Zimbabwe, former president of PF ZAPU.
 Robert Mugabe – founding father, president of Zimbabwe; lived in Highfield before becoming president in 1980.
 Enos Nkala – nationalist, ZANU PF founded in his Highfield house.
 George Tawengwa - owner of Mushandirapamwe Hotel was the first black person to buy a farm in then Rhodesia. George and his wife Mabel were featured in a 1977 The Herald newspaper to mark this historic milestone. His sons are all businessmen and farmers, and Charles and Solomon Tawengwa were mayors of Harare, with Charles recently appointed senator.
 Paul Tangi Mhova Mkondo – Insurance Guru, Political Prisoner, nationalist, international music promoter, philanthropist, educator, indigenous businessman and commercial farmer.
 Dr Edward Pswarayi - second black African medical doctor in Zimbabwe; the first was Dr Tichafa Samuel Parirenyatwa, former Deputy Minister of Health and former Deputy Minister of Transport.
 Dr Muchengetwa Bgoni, a humanitarian and philanthropist.
 Gregy Vambe, an accounting guru, philanthropist and the founder of Vambe Holdings.

Sport
 Vusi Sibanda - Zimbabwean cricketer.
Tinotenda Kadewere

Entertainment
Michael Chinyamurindi - an international film actor born and raised in Highfield.
 Oliver Mtukudzi – an international superstar and acclaimed musician, born and raised in Highfield.
 Thomas Mapfumo – an international musician, owns a Division one soccer team Lions based at Gwanzura stadium, regular performer at Machipisa.
 Marshall Munhumumwe and the Four Brothers – musicians, formed in Highfield and were regulars at Machipisa Night Club and Saratoga.
 James Chimombe – a musician, grew up in Highfield and was mentored by Daniel Mugona (Sekuru Daniel) of Lusaka, Highfield; sponsored and promoted by businessman Paul Tangi Mhova Mkondo at Hide Out Club 99.
 Safirio Madzikatire (Mukadota) – a massively popular multi-talented actor and musician; used the Cyril Jennings Hall (locally known as CJ) in Old Highfield as a base for rehearsals.
 Tinashé – a British singer-songwriter.
 Masimba Hwati -(Artist, sculptor,sound artist and researcher-born in the early 1980's

See also

 Harare
 Epworth
 Masasa
 Mbare

References

Suburbs of Harare